Lanier is an unincorporated community in Bryan County, in the U.S. state of Georgia. It is located about 4 miles east of Pembroke, Georgia, where Georgia Route 204 ends at U.S. Route 280. There is a monument for J.O. Bacon at this intersection.

History
A post office called Lanier was established in 1893, and remained in operation until it was discontinued in 1955. The community was named for Clement Lanier, an English classical musician.

References

Unincorporated communities in Bryan County, Georgia
Unincorporated communities in Georgia (U.S. state)